This Other Eden is a 1959 Irish comedy drama film directed by Muriel Box and starring Audrey Dalton, Leslie Phillips and Niall MacGinnis.

The film's prologue involves the death of an Irish commandant during the Irish War of Independence, who is shot by the Black and Tans. The film then skips forward a few decades, to the unveiling of a statue commemorating the war hero. When an Englishman arrives to settle in Ireland, the locals distrust him and soon blame him for the statue's destruction.

Plot
The film opens with a prologue set during the Irish War of Independence. Mick Devereaux and Commandant Jack Carberry of the Irish Republican Army (IRA) are meeting a British officer to negotiate a cease-fire. Carberry walks down a deserted road and is suddenly fired upon by hidden Black and Tan soldiers. Devereaux kneels beside Carberry as he dies, and Carberry pleads with him to "see to everything".

Several years later, local Gombeen man McRoarty is attending a meeting of the Carberry Memorial Committee. His daughter Maire is returning home from England. On the train, Maire meets Englishman Crispin Brown, who wishes to settle in Ballymorgan. A large house in Ballymorgan named Kilgarrig is soon to be auctioned. Preparations are being made for the erection of a statue commemorating Commandant Carberry. Maire meets her friend Conor Heaphy on the train to Ballymorgan.

At the hotel, Maire introduces Crispin to everyone. He faces some hostility from Clannery for being an Englishman. Conor also receives an awkward response from the men, which puzzles him. McRoarty fears that Conor and Maire will begin a romantic relationship and reveals to her that Conor is the illegitimate son of Jack Carberry. Maire is accepting of the news but declares that she never had a romantic interest in Conor. Conor tells the Canon that he wishes to become a priest, but the Canon is hesitant. Devereaux eventually tells Conor that he is the illegitimate son of Carberry, which angers him.

The statue to commemorate Carberry is unveiled. Its abstract design is met with disgust and disappointment from the crowd. Crispin is particularly vocal about his displeasure. Crispin proposes to Maire and asks her to live with him in Kilgarrig. Maire declines, stating that she could never live in Ballymorgan. The statue is blown up, and Crispin is initially blamed. Crispin reveals that his father was the English officer Carberry intended to meet on the night of his death. He resigned his post in sympathy with the IRA following Carberry's murder.

An angry crowd gathers at the hotel, still maintaining that Crispin is to blame. Crispin goes out to the hotel balcony and manages to calm the crowd by praising Ireland and promising to pay for a new statue. Conor enters and attempts to reveal to the crowd that he is the true culprit, but is stopped by Maire and Devereaux. The men at the hotel are horrified to find that Conor wishes to stand trial and make everything public. Devereaux bids him to be more understanding. Maire explains the situation to Crispin, and he reveals that he too is illegitimate. He also reveals his mother was Irish and a Protestant. Maire is completely accepting of this information, to her father's annoyance.

McRoarty receives a phone call that a journalist is coming to Ballymorgan to investigate what happened to the statue. The journalist, MacPherson, arrives with photographers, but the townspeople deny that there was a riot and that Conor was involved. The Canon assures Conor he will be able to fulfil his vocation in some way, even if he does not become a priest.

Crispin succeeds in purchasing Kilgarrig. Clannery blames the destruction on a faulty electrical cable lighting some explosives that he left near the statue. McRoarty and Maire argue about her wish to return to England. Maire informs Crispin that if he still wants to marry her, he should ask her father for a large dowry. Crispin succeeds in procuring the dowry and Maire's hand in marriage.

Basis 
This Other Eden is an adaptation of the play of the same name by Louis D'Alton. The play was first performed at the Queen's Theatre in June 1953 by the Abbey players.

Production 
The film was made at Ardmore Studios in Bray, County Wicklow. British director and writer Muriel Box was the first woman to direct an Irish feature film, receiving the script for This Other Eden on 1 January 1959. Shooting was completed on 12 February 1959, just under a month from when filming began. Box wrote in her diary that on the set of This Other Eden "for the first time that I can remember I looked around with genuine love and affection for the crew who were working with me and the pleasure which the artists gave me I have not experienced before in films". The film was distributed by Regal Films International and had its Irish premiere at the Cork Film Festival in September 1959.

Cast
 Audrey Dalton as Maire McRoarty
 Leslie Phillips as Crispin Brown
 Niall MacGinnis as Devereaux
 Geoffrey Golden as McRoarty
 Norman Rodway as Conor Heaphy
 Milo O'Shea as Pat Tweedy
 Harry Brogan as Clannery
 Paul Farrell as McNeely
 Eddie Golden as Sergeant Crilly
 Hilton Edwards as The Canon
Fay Sargent as Canon's Housekeeper
 Philip O'Flynn as Postman
 Ria Mooney as Mother Superior
 Isobel Couser as Mrs. O'Flaherty

Critical reception
TV Guide noted, "this unlikely subject for a comedy is slanted in favor of the British". David Parkinson in the Radio Times called it "a curious film for Leslie Phillips to find himself in, this is an overwrought tale about the emotions that erupt when the statue of a long-dead IRA hero is blown up in the square of a sleepy Irish village....Phillips is fine...He is adequately supported by Audrey Dalton as his lover and Norman Rodway...but the film lacks the power of such Hollywood lynch dramas as Fritz Lang's Fury or William A Wellman's The Ox-Bow Incident."

References

External links

Irish comedy-drama films
1959 films
1959 comedy-drama films
Films directed by Muriel Box
Films with screenplays by Patrick Kirwan
Irish War of Independence films
Irish films based on plays
Films shot in County Wicklow
1950s English-language films